Rendulić is a Croatian surname. The surname may refer to:

Borna Rendulić (born 1992), Croatian ice hockey player
Krunoslav Rendulić (born 1973), Croatian football manager
Lothar Rendulic (1887–1971), German general
Zoran Rendulić (born 1984), Serbian football player